Samantha Michelle Arévalo Salinas (born September 30, 1994) is an Ecuadorian swimmer. At the 2012 Summer Olympics, she competed in the Women's 800 metre freestyle, finishing in 29th place overall in the heats, failing to qualify for the final. She trains in Rome, Italy.

Career

2013 Bolivarian Games 
participated in the open water competition in the Trujillo 2013 Bolivarian Games with her training partner Ivan Enderica. Samantha won a gold medal with a time of 2:08:33. Due to the low temperatures of the lake, many participants withdrew because of hypothermia.

Toronto 2015 
At first it was announced that the Ecuadorian swimmer won the Pan American gold, but after analyzing the results, Samantha Arévalo was left with the bronze medal for a tenth of a second. The winner was the American Eva Fabian with a time of 2: 03: 17.0. Samantha, finished with a time of 2: 03: 167.1.

In 2019, she competed in the women's marathon 10 kilometres at the 2019 Pan American Games held in Lima, Peru. She did not finish her race.

References

External links 

 Samantha Arévalo, London 2012

1994 births
Living people
Ecuadorian female swimmers
Female long-distance swimmers
Olympic swimmers of Ecuador
Swimmers at the 2012 Summer Olympics
Swimmers at the 2016 Summer Olympics
Ecuadorian female freestyle swimmers
Swimmers at the 2011 Pan American Games
Swimmers at the 2015 Pan American Games
Pan American Games bronze medalists for Ecuador
Pan American Games medalists in swimming
World Aquatics Championships medalists in open water swimming
People from Cuenca, Ecuador
South American Games silver medalists for Ecuador
South American Games bronze medalists for Ecuador
South American Games medalists in swimming
Competitors at the 2010 South American Games
Competitors at the 2014 South American Games
Swimmers at the 2019 Pan American Games
Medalists at the 2015 Pan American Games
21st-century Ecuadorian women
20th-century Ecuadorian women